Baixa Verde is a microregion in the Brazilian state of Rio Grande do Norte.

Municipalities 
The microregion consists of the following municipalities:
 Bento Fernandes
 Jandaíra
 João Câmara
 Parazinho
 Poço Branco

References

Microregions of Rio Grande do Norte